Gooseberry Island can refer to:
Gooseberry Island, Newfoundland and Labrador, Canada
Gooseberry Island (Massachusetts), United States